The Aspen Institute is an international nonprofit organization founded in 1949 as the Aspen Institute for Humanistic Studies. The institute's stated aim is the realization of "a free, just, and equitable society" through seminars, policy programs, conferences, and leadership development initiatives. The institute is headquartered in Washington, D.C., United States, and has campuses in Aspen, Colorado (its original home), and near the shores of the Chesapeake Bay at the Wye River in Maryland. It has partner Aspen Institutes in London, Berlin, Rome, Madrid, Paris, Lyon, Tokyo, New Delhi, Prague, Bucharest, Mexico City, and Kyiv, as well as leadership initiatives in the United States and on the African continent, India, and Central America.

The Aspen Institute is largely funded by foundations such as the Carnegie Corporation, the Rockefeller Brothers Fund, the Gates Foundation, the Lumina Foundation, and the Ford Foundation, by seminar fees, and by individual donations. Its board of trustees includes leaders from politics, government, business and academia who also contribute to its support. A report by the Center for International Policy's Foreign Influence Transparency Initiative of the top 50 think tanks on the University of Pennsylvania's Global Go-To Think Tanks rating index found that during the period 2014-2018 the Aspen Institute received the fifth-highest amount of funding from outside the United States compared to other think tanks, with a total of more than US$8 million from donors that originated primarily in Western democracies but also "sizeable donations from undemocratic regimes in Saudi Arabia and the United Arab Emirates."

History
The institute was largely the creation of Walter Paepcke, a Chicago businessman who had become inspired by the Great Books program of Mortimer Adler at the University of Chicago. In 1945, Paepcke visited Bauhaus artist and architect Herbert Bayer, AIA, who had designed and built a Bauhaus-inspired minimalist home outside the decaying former mining town of Aspen, in the Roaring Fork Valley. Paepcke and Bayer envisioned a place where artists, leaders, thinkers, and musicians could gather. Shortly thereafter, while passing through Aspen on a hunting expedition, oil industry maverick Robert O. Anderson (soon to be founder and CEO of Atlantic Richfield) met with Bayer and shared in Paepcke's and Bayer's vision. In 1949, Paepcke organized a 20-day international celebration for the 200th birthday of German poet and philosopher Johann Wolfgang von Goethe. The celebration attracted over 2,000 attendees, including Albert Schweitzer, José Ortega y Gasset, Thornton Wilder, and Arthur Rubinstein.

In 1949, Paepcke founded the Aspen Institute; and later the Aspen Music Festival and eventually (with Bayer and Anderson) the International Design Conference at Aspen (IDCA). Paepcke sought a forum "where the human spirit can flourish", especially amid the whirlwind and chaos of modernization. He hoped that the institute could help business leaders recapture what he called "eternal verities": the values that guided them intellectually, ethically, and spiritually as they led their companies. Inspired by philosopher Mortimer Adler's Great Books seminar at the University of Chicago, which was later adopted by Encyclopædia Britannica's Great Books of the Western World, Paepcke worked with Anderson to create the Aspen Institute Executive Seminar. In 1951, the institute sponsored a national photography conference attended by Ansel Adams, Dorothea Lange, Ben Shahn, Berenice Abbott, and other notables. During the 1960s and 1970s, the institute added organizations, programs, and conferences, including the Aspen Center for Physics, the Aspen Strategy Group, Communications and Society Program and other programs that concentrated on education, communications, justice, Asian thought, science, technology, the environment, and international affairs.

In 1979, through a donation by Corning Glass industrialist and philanthropist Arthur A. Houghton Jr., the institute acquired a 1,000-acre (4 km) campus on the eastern shore of the Chesapeake Bay in Maryland, known today as the Wye River Conference Centers.

In 1996, the first Socrates Program seminar was hosted.

In 2005, it held the first Aspen Ideas Festival, featuring leading minds from around the world sharing and speaking on global issues. The institute, along with The Atlantic, hosts the festival annually. It has trained philanthropists such as Carrie Morgridge. It has since added additional events such as the Aspen Ideas Health and Aspen Ideas Climate. In 2023, the Aspen Ideas Climate event included Vice President Kamala Harris and music legend Gloria Estefan. 

Since 2013, the Aspen Institute together with U.S. magazine The Atlantic and Bloomberg Philanthropies has participated in organizing the annual CityLab event, a summit dedicated to develop strategies for the challenges of urbanization in today's cities.

Walter Isaacson was the president and CEO of Aspen Institute from 2003 to June 2018. Isaacson announced in March 2017 that he would step down as president and CEO at the end of the year. On November 30, 2017, Daniel Porterfield was announced as his successor. Porterfield succeeded Isaacson on June 1, 2018.

In April 2020, the company received approximately $8 million in federally backed small business loans as part of the Paycheck Protection Program. The company received scrutiny over this loan, which meant to protect small and private businesses. The Washington Post noted their large endowment and membership of billionaires made this problematic. Dele Olojede, a fellow at the institute, called it "contrary to the stated purpose of this institute", that "one of America’s most elite institutions thinks it is okay to take the money", going on to say "Those who purport to be values-based and public-spirited leaders cannot at the same time put self interest first, when there is so much human suffering and death". The day after Olojede and the Washington Post highlighted the funding, Aspen Institute announced they would return it, stating "Upon listening to our communities and further reflection, we have made the decision to return the loan".

Assets
As of 2019 the Aspen Institute had net assets of $310,055,857.

Funding details
Funding details as of 2019:

Fellowships

New Voices Fellowship
The New Voices Fellowship is a year long program for applicants from Africa, Asia, and Latin America. Every year, nominations are accepted from August through October. Fellows are selected in December and announced publicly in early January.

The New Voices Fellowship is a non-residential program. During the fellowship year, fellows meet three times for one week sessions. There are no age limitations for fellows. All expenses for participation in the fellowship are covered by the program. At times the program will also cover the cost of "media-related activities and conferences."

Awards

Aspen Prize for Community College Excellence
Community Colleges which succeed in attaining exceptional results for all students during their time in college and as post-graduates are awarded the Aspen Prize for Community College Excellence.

Recipients to date include:
 2019 Indian River State College
 2019 Miami Dade College
 2019 Seminole State College of Florida
 2017 Lake Area Technical College
 2015 Santa Fe College
 2013 Santa Barbara City College
 2013 Walla Walla Community College
 2011 Valencia College

Aspen Institute Faculty Pioneers and Dissertation Proposal Award
The Financial Times called the Faculty Pioneers and Dissertation Proposal Awards the "Oscars of the business school world". These honor business school instructors with an outstanding track record of leadership and risk-taking in ensuring that the MBA curriculum incorporates social, environmental and ethical issues.

Recipients in the Category "Lifetime Achievement" include:
 2010 James E. Post, John F. Smith, Jr. Professor in Management at the School of Management at Boston University
 2010 David Vogel, Solomon P. Lee Professor of Business Ethics at Haas School of Business, University of California at Berkeley

Excellence and Equity in Community College STEM Award
Community Colleges which demonstrate the provision of outstanding technical education and successfully link students, regardless of their race, ethnicity, family income or gender, with STEM careers as a gateway to economic mobility, are eligible to receive the Excellence and Equity in Community College STEM Award. The prize, awarded in co-operation of the Aspen Institute and Siemens Foundation, provides leading college staff with a benchmark standard of development and technical programs which foster equitable student success by highlighting exemplary practices of the winning programs.

Recipients include:
 2020 San Jacinto College

See also
Aspen Review Central Europe
Aspen Summer Words
Aspen Strategy Group
Aristotelianism
Educational perennialism

References

External links
 
 Board of Trustees at Aspen Institute 

Aspen, Colorado
Foreign policy and strategy think tanks in the United States
Political and economic think tanks in the United States
Non-profit organizations based in Washington, D.C.
Think tanks based in Washington, D.C.
Think tanks established in 1950
Humanist associations
1950 establishments in Colorado